Cottonwood Canyon may refer to:

In the United States

Arizona
Cottonwood Canyon, Arizona, near Sedona

California 
Cottonwood Canyon (Alpine County), a valley in Alpine County, California, 
Cottonwood Canyon (Inyo County), a valley in Inyo County, California, 
Cottonwood Canyon (Joshua Tree National Park), a valley in Riverside County, California, 
Cottonwood Canyon (Kern County), a valley in Kern County, California, 
Cottonwood Canyon (Lassen County), a valley in Lassen County, California, 
Cottonwood Canyon (White Mountains), a valley in Mono County, California, 
Cottonwood Canyon (Mono Lake), a valley in Mono County, California created by Cottonwood Creek (Mono Lake), 
Cottonwood Canyon (California-Nevada), a valley in Mono County, California and Lyon County, Nevada, 
Cottonwood Canyon (Santa Barbara County), a valley in Santa Barbara County, California, 
Cottonwood Canyon (Mid Hills), a valley in San Bernardino County, California, 
Cottonwood Canyon (Little Tujunga Wash), a valley in Los Angeles County, California, 	
Cottonwood Canyon (Santa Catalina Island), a valley in Los Angeles County, California, 
Cottonwood Canyon (San Jacinto River), a valley in the Temescal Mountains, Riverside County, California, 
Cottonwood Canyon (Bautista Canyon), a valley in the San Jacinto Mountains, Riverside County, California, 
Cottonwood Canyon (Whitewater River), a valley in Riverside County, California, 
Cottonwood Canyon (Yolo County), a valley in Yolo County, California, 
Cottonwood Canyon (Mason Valley), in Mason Valley, San Diego County, California,

Nebraska
Cottonwood Canyon, Nebraska, near Maxwell

Oregon
Cottonwood Canyon State Park, Oregon

Utah
Little Cottonwood Canyon, Utah, near Salt Lake City
Big Cottonwood Canyon, Utah, near Salt Lake City
Cottonwood Canyon (Kane County, Utah), in the southern part of the state, traversed by Road 400
Cottonwood Canyon (San Juan County, Utah), in the southern part of the state; with Cottonwood Wash (tributary of San Juan River)

In Canada 
Cottonwood Canyon (British Columbia), on the Skeena River, near Cedarvale, British Columbia
Cottonwood Canyon (Fraser River), on the Fraser River, near Quesnel, British Columbia